Dipolog Cathedral, canonically recognized as the Our Lady of the Most Holy Rosary Cathedral Parish, is a Roman Catholic church located in Estaka, Dipolog, Zamboanga del Norte. The cathedral is the seat of the Roman Catholic Diocese of Dipolog.

History

Dipolog was formerly a barrio of Dapitan. In April 1894, the construction of the church of Dipolog was begun while the first mass within the completed church was held in June 1894. The parish of Dipolog was founded on June 30, 1896 with Fr. Esteban Yepes, a Jesuit, serving as its first parish priest. The first church altar of Dipolog was designed by José Rizal while he was exiled in Dapitan. The features of the church are its wooden ceiling, wooden bas relief of the four Evangelists, massive adobe stone walls, and reredos, among others. In 1913, Dipolog formally became a separate town from Dapitan. The church became a cathedral when the Diocese of Dipolog was canonically founded in 1967. Reforms brought by the Second Vatican Council changed the church's reredo into a simple one with vertical design and a central bell tower being added to the façade. In 1986, the nave's main columns were removed under the helm of Msgr. Salvador Mora. As part of centennial anniversary of Dipolog's parish foundation in 1996, the cathedral's main reredo was restored with carved marble under Msgr. Esteban Gaudicos. Bishop Jose Manguiran, Dipolog's second bishop, led the cathedral interior renovation in 2007, the original walls restoration in 2008, and the 2009 renovation of the façade. Then Manila cardinal-archbishop Gaudencio Rosales led the blessing of the renovated façade in May 2009.

Present day
In 2021, the cathedral was designated as one of the 500 Jubilee Churches as part of the activities for the quincentennial of Philippine Christianity.

References

External links
 Facebook page 

Dipolog
Buildings and structures in Dipolog
Roman Catholic cathedrals in the Philippines
Spanish Colonial architecture in the Philippines
19th-century Roman Catholic church buildings in the Philippines
20th-century Roman Catholic church buildings in the Philippines
Roman Catholic churches in Zamboanga del Norte